"Reach" is a song by English pop group S Club 7. Released as the lead single from their second studio album, 7 (2000), on 22 May 2000, it is an up-tempo track co-written by Cathy Dennis and Republica keyboardist Andrew Todd.

"Reach" debuted at number two on the UK Singles Chart and spent three weeks at its peak, unable to dislodge Sonique's "It Feels So Good" from number one. The song has sold 600,000 copies in the UK, allowing it to receive a platinum sales certification from the British Phonographic Industry (BPI). "Reach" was the theme tune to the second series of the group's CBBC series, L.A. 7.

Single information
"Reach", the fourth single from S Club 7, discusses how, if one follows their dreams and "reach for the stars", they are destined to fulfill their goals. Like songs before it, "Reach" sees vocals shared around the group. Originally recorded for S Club 7's first album, it was performed by the group as a featured track on the Boyfriends & Birthdays television special which aired on 12 December 1999. This track instantly became popular and, after some minor adjustments, was chosen as the first single from the group's second album 7. The song was a popular track on the band's arena tours. The group often commented on how audience members of all ages would "go crazy" for the song.

The single was notable for not being released in neither Australia nor the United States, both of whom had received releases of the band's first three singles from their debut album. The reason for this was not given, so in both countries, "Natural" served as the lead single from 7. The single contains an additional remix by Eiffel 65, while a limited edition 3-inch CD available with cans of Pepsi contains a further remix by Steve Anderson. This version has Jo O'Meara and Bradley McIntosh dividing Jon Lee's verse between them, and O'Meara also takes Paul Cattermole's middle-eight section. The cassette format of "Reach" features an exclusive track, a karaoke version of "Reach". Also included on the single are two B-sides, "I'll Be There" and "Someday, Someway", and a remix of "S Club Party" by Cattermole and McIntosh. The Almighty remix of "Reach", featuring on the "Never Had a Dream Come True", contains an alternate vocal take with Lee singing O'Meara's first verse. "I'll Be There" was later included on 7, while "Someday, Someway" remained as a B-side. It was later performed during episode ten of L.A. 7, "Making Movies".

On the S Club United Tour, a clip from the "Reach" video of Cattermole singing was played during his part, due to his departure from the band the year before. The band later recorded a "United" version of the song with S Club 8 following Cattermole's departure from the band.

Music video
The music video takes place in Littlerock, California. At the start of the video, many of the townspeople are going on with their everyday lives, until S Club arrive in a large pink bus. There are strong contrasting colours in this music video, with the dull appearance of the town and the people in it, contrasting with the bright colours of S Club's pink, blue and yellow bus.

In the video, S Club 7 have arrived to spread a little joy to the townspeople. To symbolise this, they distribute neon bubblegum; when the townsfolk chew them, they become happy and realise that their dreams can be met, and are not limited to just a small town.

Throughout the video, many groups of people – such as the local school kids and a brass band – come to see the group as their drive through their town. At the end of the video, with their job done, S Club exit the town in their pink bus, by driving into the distance, eventually lifting up off the ground and disappearing. It was revealed that the smoke that was emitted from the S Club bus when any candies were given made the extras on set cough and splutter, meaning many shots had to have more than one take.

Track listings
 UK CD1 and Australian CD single
 "Reach" – 4:05
 "Reach" (Eiffel 65 edit) – 4:09
 "I'll Be There" – 3:25
 "Reach" (CD-ROM video)

 UK CD2 and European CD single
 "Reach" – 4:05
 "S Club Party" (Paul & Bradley's remix) – 3:49
 "Someday, Someway" – 3:15

 UK cassette single
 "Reach" – 4:05
 "Reach" (karaoke version) – 4:05

Credits and personnel
Credits are lifted from the 7 album booklet.

Studio
 Mastered at Transfermation (London, England)

Personnel

 Cathy Dennis – writing, keyboards, production, additional vocal production
 Toddy – writing (as Andrew Todd), guitars, production
 Gus Isidore – guitars
 Dave Arch – piano, organ, keyboards, programming, arrangements
 Gary O'Toole – drums
 Geoff Holroyde – additional drums
 Andy Duncan – additional drums
 The Kick Horns – brass
 Thom Russo – additional vocal production
 Andy Wright – additional production and programming
 Stephen Lipson – additional production
 Heff Moraes – mixing
 Noel Summerville – mastering
 Richard Dowling – mastering

Charts

Weekly charts

Year-end charts

Decade-end charts

Certifications

References

2000 songs
2000 singles
Music television series theme songs
Polydor Records singles
S Club 7 songs
Songs written by Cathy Dennis
Songs about dreams